British manufactured cars have always been used as prime ministerial cars by the prime ministers of the United Kingdom. The cars currently used are armoured, custom built Range Rover Sentinel supercharged 5.0 litre V8 models.

Prime ministerial and ministerial limousines are operated and administered by the Government Car Service, an executive agency of the Department for Transport, and stored and maintained at 10 Downing Street. The cars are driven by officers from the Metropolitan Police Royalty & Specialist Protection branch, skilled in protection convoy, anti hijack and evasive driving skills.

They are escorted by three to four unmarked Land Rovers or Ford Galaxy and at least nine to ten RaSP officers, with the ability to utilise motorcycle outriders from the Metropolitan Police Special Escort Group to aid in the swift travel and protection of the motorcade.

The current model fleet was first seen in use on 8 September 2021.

General specifications
Many details are classified, but the current Range Rover Sentinel models are estimated to have cost up to £400,000. They feature a number of security features, including a 13 mm explosive resistant steel plate underneath the body, titanium and Kevlar lined cabins, armoured windows with bullet resistant polycarbonate toughened glass, and run flat tyres. The bodywork can withstand hits from 7.62mm high-velocity, armour-piercing rounds.

The cars are also equipped with an independent, self contained oxygen supply, to protect the Prime Minister and other passengers against chemical or biological attack.

The vehicle used to be classed as B7 level  but under the new system, called VPAM, is classed as VPAM9, and is understood to be capable of withstanding the blast of 15 kg equivalent TNT, and sustained attack by a variety of other armour piercing weapons.

Previous cars
Since the early-1980s, when Margaret Thatcher switched from the Rover P5 models that had been in use since the 1960s, all prime ministerial cars have been from the Jaguar XJ range of the day, or its Daimler-badged variant.

The 2000 model replaced a British racing green XJ40 model, built for John Major, which gained international media attention when it bore Tony Blair to Buckingham Palace on the day after the 1997 general election. For the first few months of his premiership in 2007, Gordon Brown reverted to the previous prime ministerial car, a navy blue (X308) model purchased in 2000, before starting to use the silver model. A British racing green X308 took Gordon Brown to Buckingham Palace on 6 April 2010 to request the dissolution of Parliament, but it was the 2000 model that took him on his last ride as Prime Minister.

David Cameron arrived at 10 Downing Street following his appointment in a silver 2010 Jaguar XJ X350 model, but a new X351 Sentinel model was delivered on 13 May 2010.

On 12 August 2011, one of the previous Jaguar XJ Sentinel fleet was damaged when its driver dented the car on a high kerb in Salford, although the car was able to be driven away. On 17 June 2020, Boris Johnson was in one of the vehicles when a crash occurred due to a protester running in front of the motorcade.

Current and previous cars 

 Humber Pullman – Winston Churchill, Clement Attlee, Anthony Eden, Harold Macmillan, Alec Douglas-Home
 Rover P5 – Harold Wilson, Edward Heath, James Callaghan, and Margaret Thatcher
 Jaguar XJ (Series III) – Margaret Thatcher, John Major
 Jaguar XJ (XJ40) – John Major, Tony Blair
 Jaguar XJ (X308) – Tony Blair, Gordon Brown
 Jaguar XJ (X350) – Gordon Brown, David Cameron
 Jaguar XJ (X351) – David Cameron, Theresa May, Boris Johnson
 Range Rover Sentinel - Boris Johnson, Liz Truss, Rishi Sunak

See also 
 Official state car
 Bentley State Limousine, the car used by King Charles III
 Government of the United Kingdom
 Air transports of heads of state and government

References

Department for Transport
British Prime Minister's Office
Road transport of heads of state
Vehicles of the United Kingdom